Striiide is the second studio album by Desmadrados Soldados de Ventura, released on 1 October 2013 by Deep Distance. The cover art, illustrated by Rudy Rucker, made number twenty-five out of thirty on Tiny Mix Tapes' album covers of the year list.

Track listing

Personnel
Adapted from the Striiide liner notes.

Desmadrados Soldados de Ventura
 Kate Armitage – vocals
 Andrew Cheetham – drums
 Zak Hane – bass guitar
 Tim Horrocks – electric guitar
 Anthony Joinson – bass guitar
 Nick Mitchell – electric guitar
 Ros Murray – electric guitar

Production and additional personnel
 Patrick Crane – recording
 Rudy Rucker – cover art, illustrations

Release history

References

External links 
 Striiide at Bandcamp

2013 albums
Desmadrados Soldados de Ventura albums